Pa Nderry M'Bai (died 22 November 2021) was a Gambian American journalist based in Raleigh, North Carolina. Mr. M'Bai was most notable for being the Founding Managing Editor, and Publisher of the US based online news website, Freedom Newspaper.
Mr. Mbai, played a key role exposing human rights abuses and other injustices during former Gambia President Yahya Jammeh's time in office.

References

Year of birth missing
20th-century births
2021 deaths
American journalists
American people of Gambian descent
People from Raleigh, North Carolina